Frederick J. Marshall (July 28, 1951 – January 3, 2023) was an American jurist who was a justice of the New York State Supreme Court. An attorney and politician in the Buffalo, New York area before moving to the bench, Marshall was a former Minority Leader of the Erie County Legislature. Marshall was the son of the late New York State Supreme Court Justice Frederick M. Marshall. His brother Philip M. Marshall served as the Village Justice in the Buffalo suburb of Orchard Park, New York. Frederick J. Marshall died from non-Hodgkin lymphoma on January 3, 2023, at the age of 71.

References

1951 births
2023 deaths 
Deaths from non-Hodgkin lymphoma 
Deaths from cancer in New York (state)
New York Supreme Court Justices
Politicians from Buffalo, New York
People from Erie County, New York
County legislators in New York (state)
Lawyers from Buffalo, New York
New York (state) Republicans
Buffalo State College alumni
University at Buffalo Law School alumni